{{Album ratings
|rev1 = Allmusic
|rev1score =  [ link]
|rev2 = RapReviews.com
|rev2score = (8.5/10) link
|rev3 = The Smoking Section
|rev3score =  link
|rev4 = Sputnikmusic
|rev4score =  link
|rev5 = Pitchfork Media
|rev5score = (7.8/10) link
|rev6 = DjBooth.net
|rev6score =  link
|rev7 = URB Magazine
|rev7score =  link
|rev8 = XXL
|rev8score =  link
|rev9 = HipHopSite.Com
|rev9score =  link
}}Chemical Warfare'' is the second studio album by American hip hop producer and recording artist the Alchemist. The album was released on July 7, 2009.

Meaning of the title

Featured artists and singles 
The Alchemist recorded material for the album with Evidence, Fabolous, Mobb Deep, Dilated Peoples, Kool G Rap, Pusha T, Jadakiss, KRS-One, Snoop Dogg, Twista, Maxwell, Three 6 Mafia, Juvenile and Eminem. The first song released from the album was "Keys to the City", which features Prodigy and Nina Sky. Alchemist leaked the song himself in 2007. A video for the song, produced, shot, edited and directed by the Alchemist, was released on July 28, 2008. The first official single announced was  "Lose Your Life" featuring Jadakiss, Snoop Dogg & Pusha T. The official video for "Smile", featuring Maxwell and Twista, was released on June 11, 2009.

Track listing

Chart history

References 

2009 albums
Albums produced by the Alchemist (musician)
The Alchemist (musician) albums